Chris Jones (born April 10, 1993) is an American-born naturalized Armenian professional basketball player for Valencia of the Spanish Liga ACB and the EuroLeague. Jones also represents the Armenia national team in international competition.

High school career
Jones attended and played basketball at Lakeview Centennial High School in Garland, Class of 2011.  He averaged 16.9 points per game, and was District 10-5A’s MVP as a junior and senior. He led the Dallas-Fort Worth area with 6.9 assists per game during his senior season.  He was inducted into the Garland Sports Hall of Fame while at Centennial.

College career
Jones played three seasons at the University of North Texas, where he was the school's third all-time steals leader (127), and sixth in career assists (282). As a freshman at UNT, Jones set the freshman record with 4.26 assists per game, and averaged 14.1 points per game which was the 19th-highest nationally among freshmen.

He attended Angelo State University for his senior season, Class of 2015, and averaged 15.3 points per game with 4.7 assists and 2.1 steals. In 2015 Jones was Lone Star Conference All-First Team, Lone Star Conference All-Defensive Team, and National Association of Basketball Coaches All-District South Central First Team.

Professional career
On August 5, 2019, Jones signed with Bursaspor of the Turkish Basketbol Süper Ligi (BSL). He averaged 15.4 points, 3.2 rebounds, 6.8 assists and league-high 1.9 steals in 23 games played.

On August 16, 2020, Jones signed with Maccabi Tel Aviv of the Israeli Basketball Premier League and the EuroLeague. On July 10, 2021, he officially parted ways with the Israeli powerhouse.

On July 20, 2021, Jones signed with ASVEL of the French LNB Pro A and the EuroLeague.

On June 27, 2022, Jones signed a one-year deal with Valencia of the Spanish Liga ACB and the EuroLeague.

National team career 
Jones plays for the Armenia national team. He helped them win the gold medal at the 2022 FIBA European Championship for Small Countries. On July 2, Jones scored 41 points, including 8 three-pointers, and 10 rebounds in the final against Malta. Jones was named the MVP of the tournament and was named to the All-Star Five after averaging 24.5 points, 6.5 rebounds and 7.3 assists.

Career statistics

EuroLeague

|-
| align="left" | 2020–21
| align="left" | Maccabi
| 34 || 7 || 17.4 || .478 || .362 || .750 || 1.8 || 2.8 || .9 || .1 || 7.0 || 7.5
|-
| align="left" | 2021–22
| align="left" | ASVEL
| 31 || 31 || 27.5 || .498 || .390 || .821 || 3.2 || 3.6 || 1.5 || .1 || 13.1 || 14.7
|- class="sortbottom"
| align="center" colspan="2"| Career
| 65 || 38 || 22.2 || .490 || .377 || .802 || 2.4 || 3.2 || 1.1 || .1 || 9.9 || 10.9

Personal life
Jones is a native of Garland, Texas. Jones is the son of Latonya McCoy, and has two siblings, D’merhic and London. He is 6' 2" (188 cm), and weighs 200 pounds (91 kg).

References

External links
 Wes Bloomquist (January 27, 2015). "PLAYER SPOTLIGHT: No worries, We’ve got 5 on it," Angelo Sports.
Chris Jones at euroleague.net (archive)
Chris Jones at euroleaguebasketball.net
Chris Jones at proballers.com
Chris Jones at realgm.com
North Texas Mean Green bio

1993 births
Living people
American expatriate basketball people in France
American expatriate basketball people in Israel
American expatriate basketball people in Spain
American men's basketball players
Angelo State Rams men's basketball players
ASVEL Basket players
Basketball players from Texas
Maccabi Tel Aviv B.C. players
North Texas Mean Green men's basketball players
People from Garland, Texas
Point guards
Valencia Basket players
Armenian men's basketball players